Santa Lucía is a simple station that is part of the TransMilenio mass-transit system of Bogotá, Colombia.

Location
The station is located in southern Bogotá, specifically on Avenida Caracas with Calle 45B Sur and Diagonal 46 Sur.

It serves the Ciudad Tunal and Claret neighborhoods.

History
At the beginning of 2001, the second phase of the Caracas line of the system was opened from Tercer Milenio to the intermediate station Calle 40 Sur. A few months later, service was extended south to Portal de Usme.

The station is named Santa Lucía for the neighborhood of the same name located to the west of the station.

On January 6, 2003, an incendiary device exploded near this station. In 2004, three people were injured by shrapnel from a bomb that exploded on a bus that was on the route with Caracas at Calle 47 Sur, one block from the station.

Station services

Old trunk services

Main line service

See also
Bogotá
TransMilenio
List of TransMilenio Stations

TransMilenio
2001 establishments in Colombia